Rosella is a genus of broad-tailed parrots endemic to Australasia.

Rosella may also refer to:

 Roselle (plant), a species of hibiscus (Hibiscus sabdariffa), also known as "rosella".
 A drink made from that plant, also called "Hibiscus tea".
 Rosella (brand), a brand of Australian tomato sauce, soups, and chutney.
 MS Rosella, a cruiseferry, built in 1980 by Wärtsilä Turku shipyard (now Aker Finnyards), Finland
 Princess Rosella, a character from the King's Quest series

People (Real and Fictional)
Rosella Ayane, English footballer
Rosella Hightower, American ballerina
Rosella Postorino, Italian author
Rosella Towne, American actress
Rosella Namok, Australian artist
Rosella Sensi, Italian entrepreneur
Rosella Lau, Hong Kong model
Laura Rosella, Canadian epidemiologist
Princess Rosella, a fictional video game character in the King's Quest series by Sierra On-Line
Princess Rosella "Ro", a fictional character played by Barbie in the 2007 computer-animated film Barbie as the Island Princess

See also
Native rosella (disambiguation)
Rosalie (disambiguation)
Roselle (disambiguation)
Roseola, a childhood disease
 Rossella (disambiguation)
 Rozella (disambiguation)